Elmer Davis Lake is a  reservoir in Owen County, Kentucky. It was created in 1958 by the Kentucky Department of Fish and Wildlife Resources, and was named for a former commissioner of that department.

References

 

1958 establishments in Kentucky
Reservoirs in Kentucky
Protected areas of Owen County, Kentucky
Bodies of water of Owen County, Kentucky